Route 135, also known as Fermor Avenue, is a city route in Winnipeg, Manitoba. It runs from Dunkirk Drive to the Perimeter Highway, through the suburbs of St. Vital and St. Boniface.

The route begins as a principal arterial road, passing through residential, commercial, and industrial areas before becoming an expressway with service roads east of Lagimodière Boulevard (Highway 59). The section between St. Anne's Road and the Perimeter Highway forms part of the Trans-Canada Highway (Highway 1) route through the city.

Major intersections
From west to east:

See also

References

135
Winnipeg 135
Urban segments of the Trans-Canada Highway

St. Vital, Winnipeg
Saint Boniface, Winnipeg